Bernardino Facciotto (1540–1598) was an Italian military and civil architect, born and died in Casale Monferrato.

Biography
Born in Casale Monferrato in 1540, he was a pupil of Francesco Paciotto.
In 1564 he collaborated with him in works in the city of Turin. 
In 1576, requested by Guglielmo Gonzaga, Duke of Mantua, he was called for the construction of the city of Alba.

Then he moved to Mantua, and in 1576 at the death of the architect Giovanni Battista Bertani he received orders to continue the reconstruction of the Ducal Palace which he completed with gardens, squares, porches, galleries, courtyards and exedrals, and definitely get the look of the ducal residence. Between 1580 and 1582 he made the "patio of the eight faces", (Il cortile delle Otto Facce).

The activity of Facciotto for the court of the Gonzaga also extended outside this city. 
In Motteggiana in 1582 he completely renovated the Ghirardina Court, initiated by Luca Fancelli around 1470.
In 1583 he made an important work in the palace Gazzuolo and the following year he extended the residence of Goito, where Guglielmo retired to pray.

In 1587, he worked in the fortress of Cavriana, in Villimpenta's "Villa Zani" which in that same year became the property of Gonzaga and had been projected in 1530 by Giulio Romano.
At the death of Guglielmo, Facciotto worked for his successor count Vincenzo I of Gonzaga at the mausoleum of the family in the church of San Francesco in Mantua.

In 1588 he was invited to Castel Goffredo, home of Marquis Alfonso Gonzaga, for the reconstruction of the church of San Erasmo, which had suffered the fall of the dome. 
While he was busy in working at the fortifications of Casale Monferrato he died in 1598.

Facciotto had two sons who continued his career 
 Girolamo (1565-1648 circa)
 Giovan Domenico

References

Italian Renaissance architects
1540 births
1598 deaths
People from Casale Monferrato
16th-century Italian architects